Madonna of the Sleeping Cars (French: La madone des sleepings) is a 1928 French silent film directed by Marco de Gastyne and Maurice Gleize and starring Claude France, Olaf Fjord and Maurice Dekobra. It is an adaptation of Maurice Dekobra's 1925 novel of the same title, which was later turned into a 1955 sound film.

Cast
 Claude France as Lady Diana Wynham 
 Olaf Fjord as Prince Seliman 
 Henri Valbel
 Maurice Dekobra as Jail Warden 
 Boris de Fast as Varichkine 
 Mary Serta as Madame Mouravieff 
 Annette Benson
 Nat Carr
 Michèle Verly
 Sergey Efron as Prisoner

See also
 Change of Heart (1928), with Juliette Compton as Lady Winham and Olaf Fjord as Prince Seliman 
 The Phantom Gondola (1936), with Marcelle Chantal as Lady Diana Wyndham
 Madonna of the Sleeping Cars (1955), with Gisèle Pascal as Lady Diana Wyndham

References

Bibliography
 Goble, Alan. The Complete Index to Literary Sources in Film. Walter de Gruyter, 1999.

External links

1928 films
1928 drama films
French drama films
French silent films
1920s French-language films
Films based on French novels
Films directed by Maurice Gleize
Films directed by Marco de Gastyne
Pathé films
French black-and-white films
Silent drama films
1920s French films